Tridrepana aurorina is a moth in the family Drepanidae. It was described by Felix Bryk in 1943. It is found in north-eastern Myanmar.

The wingspan is about 31.2-36.2 mm. Adults are similar to Tridrepana sadana, but lack dark scales.

References

Moths described in 1943
Drepaninae
Moths of Asia